Dinesh Chhetri is a Bhutanese former footballer who is last known to have played as a forward.

Career

On 30 June 2002, Chhetri scored for Bhutan during The Other Final, 4-0 win over Montserrat, when they were the 2 lowest ranked national teams on the FIFA rankings.

References

External links
 

Bhutanese footballers
Bhutan international footballers
Living people
Association football forwards
Year of birth missing (living people)
Bhutanese people of Nepalese descent